Maurice Kraus (31 May 1907 – 20 January 1998) was a French racing cyclist. He rode in the 1935 Tour de France.

References

1907 births
1998 deaths
French male cyclists
Place of birth missing